The 1998 European Speedway Club Champions' Cup.

In 1998 UEM (European Motyorcycle Union) launches new competition - European Speedway Club Champions' Cup open for European countries. Apart lack entries from leading nations Britain, Denmark and Sweden, 14 countries typed their clubs champions for competition.

Group C

 SC Rivne

Due to lack of an organiser for the scheduled Group C event, Bulgaria and France were scrapped with Ukraine going to group B.

Group B

 May 17, 1998
  Rivne

Group A

 June 21, 1998
  Ljubljana

Final

 August 23, 1998
  Bydgoszcz

See also

1998
Euro C